Patrick J. Joyce is a Democratic member of the Illinois Senate from the 40th district since November 8, 2019. The 40th district, located partly in the Chicago area, includes all or parts of Bourbonnais, Bradley, Chicago Heights, Coal City, Essex, Flossmoor, Frankfort, Glenwood, Hazel Crest, Homewood, Joliet, Kankakee, Manhattan, Matteson, Mokena, Monee, New Lenox, Park Forest, Richton Park, Steger, University Park, and Wilmington.

Joyce was appointed to the district on November 8, 2019 after former State Senator Toi Hutchinson resigned to become the new Illinois Cannabis Regulation Oversight Officer.

Early life, education, and career
Joyce was raised in Reddick, Illinois. He graduated from Illinois State University with a B.A. in Agribusiness. He is a fourth generation farmer and for 25 years has owned and operated his family farm. For 19 years he has been a member of the Kankakee County Farm Bureau Board of Directors.

Illinois State Senator
As of July 2022, Senator Joyce is a member of the following Illinois Senate committee:

 (Chairman of) Agriculture Committee (SAGR)
 Appropriations - Agriculture, Environment & Energy Committee (SAPP-SAAE)
 Energy and Public Utilities Committee (SENE)
 Health Committee (SHEA)
 Labor Committee (SLAB)
 Local Government Committee (SLGV)
 Next Generation of Energy Committee (SENE-ENGE)
 (Chairman of) Redistricting - Kankakee & Will Counties Committee (SRED-SDKW)
 State Government Committee (SGOA)
 (Chairman of) Subcommittee on Long-Term Care & Aging (SHEA-SHLT)

Electoral history

Personal life
Joyce is married and has three children. He currently lives in Essex, Illinois. He lost his daughter, Katelyn, to leukemia in 2011. Since her passing, Joyce has "led a team of friends and family members to raise money at the Leukemia and Lymphoma Society’s Light the Night fundraiser in Katelyn’s memory."

References

External links
Senator Patrick J. Joyce (D) 40th District at the Illinois General Assembly

21st-century American politicians
Democratic Party Illinois state senators
Illinois State University alumni
Living people
Year of birth missing (living people)
People from Kankakee County, Illinois